A European Commissioner is a member of the European Commission. Each Commissioner within the college holds a specific portfolio and are led by the President of the European Commission. In simple terms they are the equivalent of national ministers. Each European Union member state has the right to a single commissioner (before 2004, the four largest states—France, Germany, Italy and the United Kingdom—were granted two) and appoints them in consultation with the President.

The accession of Romania and Bulgaria in 2007 raised the number of commissioners from 25 to 27, and after the accession of Croatia in 2013 the number of commissioners raised to 28. 
Below is a list of all past and present European Commissioners according to the member-state they were nominated by, including the Presidents of the European Coal and Steel Community and European Atomic Energy Community. The colours indicate their political background (blue for conservative or centre-right, mainly the European People's Party, red for left-wing or social democrats, mainly the Party of European Socialists, yellow for centrist or liberals, mainly the Alliance of Liberals and Democrats for Europe Party, and green for green politicians, mainly the European Green Party; and their predecessors).

Austria

Belgium

Bulgaria

Croatia

Cyprus

Czech Republic

Denmark

Estonia

Finland

France

Germany

Greece

Hungary

Ireland

Italy

Latvia

Lithuania

Luxembourg

Malta

Netherlands

Poland

Portugal

Romania

Slovakia

Slovenia

Spain

Sweden

United Kingdom

Withdrawn nominees
A number of commissioners were formally nominated and assigned portfolios before being withdrawn after their hearing with the European Parliament, with the exception of Thorvald Stoltenberg, who withdrew after the rejection of Norway's accession referendum.

Juncker/Von der Leyen transition
The transition from the Juncker Commission to the Von der Leyen Commission resulted in a higher number of withdrawals and rejections than any previous transition. This included an agreement to not fill the seats of Juncker commissioners who took seats in the European Parliament, some states abiding by Von der Leyen's request to name female and male candidates in order to have a gender parity (with only one candidate able to be formally nominated), the rejection of several nominees by the European Parliament due to ethical concerns, and some those named to replace the rejected candidates being denied nomination by Von der Leyen.

Notes and references

European Commissioners by nationality
Commissioners by nationality